George James Coates   (8 August 1869 – 27 July 1930) was an Australian painter, primarily dealing with portraits. He worked as an official war artist to the Australian government in 1919, and from then on specialised in war subjects until his death in 1930.

Early life
Coates was born in Emerald Hill (now South Melbourne, Victoria), the son of John Coates, an artist-lithographer of English stock, and his wife Elizabeth, a daughter of Ephraim Irwin who came from Ireland. George Coates was educated at St James Grammar School, then at the age of 15 was apprenticed to a firm of glass-stainers, Messrs. Ferguson and Urie. He attended the North Melbourne school of design and then joined the evening classes at the National Gallery of Victoria Art School in Melbourne under Frederick McCubbin. He could not, however, attend continuously. His father had died when he was eight years old and the boy was sometimes unable to afford the comparatively low fees. Though not tall he was beautifully formed, an excellent swimmer and a first-rate amateur boxer. Lionel Lindsay tells the story of how a trainer had suggested that he should give up art and take up a "man's work".

Art career
At the national gallery classes Coates won first prizes for drawing and for painting from the nude, and before the conclusion of his course opened a life class. Among the students associated with him were the Lindsay brothers, Max Meldrum and George Bell, all destined to become well known as artists. In 1896 he won the Melbourne national gallery travelling scholarship, and in 1897 went to Europe as did also a fellow competitor, Miss Dora Meeson, whom he was afterwards to marry. Coates entered Julien's classes and always felt that he had been fortunate in spending his student days in Paris at such a good period of French art, while Pierre Puvis de Chavannes, Claude Monet, Pierre-Auguste Renoir, Edgar Degas and Jean-Paul Laurens were still living. He met Miss Meeson again in Paris and they became engaged, but as his only income came from his scholarship their marriage had to be postponed. In 1900 Coates left Paris and took a studio in London. He obtained employment in supplying drawings for the Historian's History of the World, but after that ceased there was great difficulty in selling black and white work and portrait commissions were scarce. On 23 July 1903 Coates and Miss Meeson were married, her father having agreed to make the young couple an allowance of £100 a year. Augustus John owned a studio which he let to them at £50 a year, and a long struggle to obtain recognition followed. One early success was a portrait of Miss Jessica Strubelle, which gained an honourable mention at the salon of 1910 and is now in the Bendigo gallery; but Coates did not really come into notice until the 1912 Royal Academy exhibition where he had three important canvases hung, "Arthur Walker and his brother Harold", now at Melbourne, "Christine Silver", and "Mother and Child" now in the Adelaide gallery. The success of these pictures led to some commissions and the financial position became easier. The exhibition of the painting of the Walker brothers in 1913 at the Société Nationale des Beaux Arts led to his being elected an associate of that society, and full membership followed some years later. In 1913 Mrs Coates brought some of their pictures to Australia which were exhibited in Melbourne and Adelaide. However, Coates fell ill, and his wife had to abandon a proposed exhibition of his work at Sydney and returned with him to Europe where a holiday in Italy soon restored his health.

World War I and late life
 
When World War I came, Coates joined the Territorial R.A.M.C. and worked as a ward orderly. He was promoted to be a sergeant and given charge of the recreation room. In April 1919 he became an official war artist to the Australian government, and made several paintings of war scenes. But he had felt the strain of the war very much, and in April 1919 was officially discharged as "no longer physically fit for war service". He, however, was able to go on with his paintings of war subjects. In 1921 he revisited Australia, exhibitions were held at the principal cities, and several pictures were sold. Returning to England in 1922 busy years of painting followed, but his health was often not good. He died suddenly on 27 July 1930.

Artistic summary
Coates was primarily a portrait painter, but when opportunity offered he could manage a subject painting with great ability showing beautiful feeling for rhythm and composition. His painting was usually low toned without losing luminosity, and the drawing was always excellent.

Collections
 Art Gallery of New South Wales
 National Gallery of Victoria, Melbourne
 Art Gallery of South Australia
 Queensland Art Gallery & Gallery of Modern Art
 Art Gallery of Western Australia
 Bendigo Art Gallery
 Art Gallery of Ballarat
 Geelong Gallery
 Castlemaine Art Museum
 Australian war museum, Canberra. 
Some examples of his work are also in English galleries and at the Canadian war museum. He was survived by his wife Dora Meeson Coates, a capable artist, who is also represented in Australian galleries. How much his wife meant to Coates may be gathered from the statement made by a friend that "he was utterly unhappy separated from her".

Works

References

Further reading
Richard Haese, 'Coates, George James (1869 - 1930)', Australian Dictionary of Biography, Volume 8, Melbourne University Press, 1981, pp 36–37.

External links

1869 births
1930 deaths
Académie Julian alumni
Artists from Melbourne
19th-century Australian painters
19th-century Australian male artists
20th-century Australian painters
20th-century Australian male artists
Members of the Royal Institute of Oil Painters
Australian male painters
Australian people of English descent
Australian people of Irish descent
People from South Melbourne
National Gallery of Victoria Art School alumni